Jessica Harper (born October 10, 1949) is an American actress and singer. Harper began her feature film career with a starring role in Brian De Palma's Phantom of the Paradise (1974), My Favorite Year (1982), as well as a role in Inserts (1975). She is best known for her portrayal of Suzy Bannion, the protagonist of Dario Argento's cult classic Suspiria (1977), and appeared in a supporting role in Luca Guadagnino's 2018 remake.

Her other films include Stardust Memories (1980), Shock Treatment (1981) (the followup to The Rocky Horror Picture Show in which she replaced Susan Sarandon as Janet Weiss), Pennies from Heaven (1981), The Blue Iguana (1988), Safe (1995), and Minority Report (2002). In addition to acting, Harper is also an author of children's music and books.

Early life
Harper was born in Chicago, Illinois, the daughter of Eleanor (née Emery), a writer, and Paul Church Harper Jr., a painter and the former chairman of the Needham Harper Worldwide advertising agency in New York. She attended the North Shore Country Day School in Winnetka, Illinois, and Sarah Lawrence College in New York. She has two sisters, Lindsay Harper duPont an illustrator and Diana Harper a teacher and three brothers: her twin brother William Harper who is a composer; Sam Harper, a screenwriter and director; and Rev. Charles Harper.

Career
Harper has appeared in more than twenty motion pictures, most notably Dario Argento's Suspiria, Brian DePalma's Phantom of the Paradise & the follow-up to The Rocky Horror Picture Show, Shock Treatment. She was also in My Favorite Year, alongside Peter O'Toole and Mark Linn-Baker, and costarred with Steve Martin and Bernadette Peters in Pennies from Heaven.  Woody Allen featured her in his films Stardust Memories and Love and Death, and she appeared in the fourth season of It's Garry Shandling's Show as well as the Steven Spielberg/Tom Cruise film Minority Report. She was seen in a 2005 episode ("Forget Me Not") of the television series Crossing Jordan.

She has written eleven books for children, and made seven albums of songs for children. She was named by Parenting magazine as "Parent of the Month" in 2004. In 2000, she sang background vocals on selected tracks on the Dan Hicks and his Hot Licks album Beatin' the Heat.

In December 2010, Harper released a cookbook titled The Crabby Cook Cookbook: Recipes and Rants.  In a January 2011 interview Harper said, "I thought it was high time there was a book that acknowledged that not everybody experiences the joy of cooking, that sometimes cooking for a family on a daily basis can be really irritating! This book, with 135 easy recipes, is for those people, crabby cooks like me!  It's a collection of humor, survival tips and recipes, for the kitchen-challenged!"  In March 2011, she was on tour promoting her book. Stops included Chicago, where she held a "Lunch and Learn with Jessica Harper".

Personal life
Harper married Thomas Edgar Rothman, a top executive at Sony Pictures (formerly of 20th Century Fox) on March 11, 1989 in an ecumenical ceremony. She has two daughters, Elizabeth and Nora, who are featured on her children's albums and books. Harper resides in Los Angeles, California, and New York City.

In a blog post on her official website in 2017, Harper revealed she had suffered from neovascular macular degeneration for the past 15 years, and that she receives injections in her eye every six weeks to treat the condition.

Recordings
A Wonderful Life (1994)

Filmography

Film

Television

Stage

References

External links

The Crabby Cook
Jessica Harper's Winnetka personal memoir (podcast)

1949 births
Living people
20th-century American actresses
21st-century American actresses
Actresses from Chicago
Actresses from Los Angeles
American women singers
American film actresses
American television actresses
American women writers
North Shore Country Day School alumni
Sarah Lawrence College alumni